Daniel McKenna (born 3 April 1987) is a rally driver from Co. Monaghan in Ireland.

In 2014, he became only the third Irishman to win the British Rally Championship and earned a WRC-3 and JWRC drive for 2015. In the 2014 British Rally Championship season, he drove a Citroën DS3 R3T, was co-driven by Arthur Kierans and he won four out of the six rallies to take the title.

He was a winner of the Billy Coleman Award as well.

References

External links
 eWRC results

Irish rally drivers
1987 births
World Rally Championship drivers
Living people
People from County Monaghan